Geetha Shishu Shikshana Sangha Institute of Engineering & Technology for Women (GSSS Mysore) is an engineering institute for women located in Mysuru, Karnataka, India. It is affiliated to Visvesvaraya Technological University and approved by AICTE.

References

External links 
 Official website

Women's engineering colleges in India
Women's universities and colleges in Karnataka
Engineering colleges in Mysore